The Genesis Theatre is a theatre located in Delta, British Columbia right next to Delta Secondary School. The theatre opened in 1990. Genesis Theater has a max capacity of 414 people in 15 rows and 10 removable seats to facilitate wheelchairs. The Genesis Theater complex is a classical proscenium theater with a fly stage and contains:

 two dressing rooms, each with 16 make-up positions, a single shower and an adjoining washroom
 orchestra pit
 lighting and sound control rooms
 drama studio / rehearsal hall
 tiered music room
 Scene Shop
 lobby with box office, coat check / concession, washrooms
 foyer with ample display areas

The theatre has produced plays and musicals such as
Macbeth (2008)
The Boy Friend (2007)
Little Shop of Horrors (2006)
Two Gentlemen of Verona (2005)
Crazy for You (2004)
West Side Story(2003)
Joseph and the Amazing Technicolor Dreamcoat (2002)
Dracula Spectacula (2001)
Oliver! (2000)

External links 
 Genesis Theatre's website

Buildings and structures in Delta, British Columbia
Theatres in British Columbia